Fred Mutch (21 November 1898 – 11 November 1986) was a former Australian rules footballer who played with Carlton and Collingwood in the Victorian Football League (VFL).

Notes

References

External links 

Fred Mutch's profile at Blueseum

1898 births
1986 deaths
Australian rules footballers from Victoria (Australia)
Australian Rules footballers: place kick exponents
Carlton Football Club players
Collingwood Football Club players